The Rio Preto National Forest is a national forest in the state of Espírito Santo, Brazil.

Location

The Rio Preto National Forest is in the Conceição da Barra municipality of the state of Espírito Santo.
It was created by decree nº 98.845 of 17 January 1990.
It became part of the Central Atlantic Forest Ecological Corridor, created in 2002.
It is administered by the Chico Mendes Institute for Biodiversity Conservation (ICMBio).

The forest contains dense tropical lowland rainforest.
338 species of arboreal plants have been identified.
The forest has been affected by forest fires and selective logging, and contains  of the exotic Eucalyptus citriodora.
Plant species include cariniana, pequi (Caryocar brasiliense), ipe (handroanthus), cedar,  cinnamon, peroba, paraju, juçara (Euterpe edulis), copal, braúna and peroba. 
Fauna include armadillos, pacas, deer, otters, marmosets, Brazilian squirrels, lizards, parrots and toucans.

Conservation

The Rio Preto National Forest is classed as IUCN protected area category VI (protected area with sustainable use of natural resources).
The objective is sustainable multiple use of forest resources and scientific research, with emphasis on methods for sustainable exploitation of native forests.
The site is only open to scheduled school visits.

The management plan for the forest was published in 1999, before the 2000 law 9.985 defined the National System of Conservation Units and provided for buffer zones.
In January 2014 the Federal Public Ministry in Espírito Santo gained a court ruling that ICMBio had 180 days to delimit buffer zones around the Rio Preto National Forest as well as the nearby  Córrego Grande Biological Reserve and the  Córrego do Veado Biological Reserve. 
A buffer zone is an area around a conservation unit where human activity is subject to various rules and restrictions.

Protected species include cougar (Puma concolor), oncilla (Leopardus tigrinus), ocelot (Leopardus pardalis), Atlantic titi or masked titi (Callicebus personatus), maned sloth (Bradypus torquatus), giant armadillo (Priodontes maximus), ringed woodpecker (Celeus torquatus), black-headed berryeater (Carpornis melanocephala), red-browed amazon (Amazona rhodocorytha), white-eared parakeet or maroon-faced parakeet (Pyrrhura leucotis), ochre-marked parakeet (Pyrrhura cruentata),

Notes

Sources

1990 establishments in Brazil
National forests of Brazil
Protected areas of Espírito Santo
Protected areas established in 1990